Checacupe or Ch'iqa Kupi (Aymara ch'iqa left, kupi right, "left right") is one of eight districts of the Canchis Province in the Cusco Region in Peru.

Geography 
The Willkanuta mountain range traverses the district. Some of the highest peaks of the district are  listed below:

The most important rivers of the district are the Willkanuta River and Ch'illkamayu, one of its right tributaries.

Ethnic groups 
The people in the district are mainly indigenous citizens of Quechua descent. Quechua is the language which the majority of the population (82.89%) learnt to speak in childhood, 17.09% of the residents started speaking using the Spanish language (2007 Peru Census).

References